Galenika a.d. is a Serbian pharmaceutical company with headquarters in Zemun, Belgrade.

History
Founded in 1945, Galenika was a major pharmaceutical drug-maker in the Balkans with exports to Europe, Africa and Asia. During its golden times, it was the greatest Yugoslav pharmaceutical company which controlled over 65% of SFR Yugoslavia market share.

In 1991, the company was bought by American ICN Pharmaceuticals, led by Serbian American businessman Milan Panić. Even during the 1990s Yugoslav Wars and massive debts of FR Yugoslavia toward the company, it kept operating positive. In 1999, by political decision of Slobodan Milošević's regime, the FR Yugoslavia took over the majority stake of the company. Following the overthrow of Slobodan Milošević in October 2000, the company returned on track and each year had tens of million euros of positive net income. As of 2006, Galenika remained a leader in research and development as the only pharmaceutical company in Serbia with an institute registered with the Ministry of Science and Environmental Protection.

However, from 2008 to 2010, Galenika rapidly accumulated debt to the point where it owed 130 million euros. Once controlling a majority market share in Serbia and former Yugoslavia, during the 2010s it became indebted company. By the 2010s, most of the Serbian formerly domestically controlled pharmaceutical market, has shifted in foreign hands.

Since 2013, the Government of Serbia has begun seeking a partner for Galenika through the privatization process. However, over the years several privatization auction processes have failed.

In August 2017, the Government of Serbia converted company's debts to state into shares in ownership structure, worth 14.696 billion dinars (122.81 million euros). As of 2017, Galenika controlled around 10% of market share in Serbia. In November 2017, Luxembourg's investment fund Aelius (related to the Brazilian largest pharmaceutical company EMS) purchased 93.73% of the company's shares from the Government of Serbia for a total of 16 million euros.

Logos 
From 1945, Galenika has changed five different logos. The first logo of company was used from 1945 to 1992, the second logo from 1992 to 1998 (which has been marked as ICN Galenika), the third logo was used from 1998 to 2002, the fourth logo has been in use from 2002 to 2021, and the fifth and incumbent logo is in use since 2021.

Market and financial data
According to 2016 annual financial report submitted to Serbian Business Registers Agency (APR), the company has 1,595 employees and it posted an annual loss of 10.45 million euros. As of 30 January 2018, Galenika has a market capitalization of €63.17 million.

Fraud
In October 2018, several high-ranking former officials of the company were sentenced before Belgrade's Special Court for the "fraud by abuse of position", in which they damaged the company for multimillion-euro bills.

References

External links
 

1945 establishments in Serbia
2017 mergers and acquisitions
Companies based in Belgrade
Pharmaceutical companies established in 1945
Pharmaceutical companies of Serbia
Serbian brands